Franco Daniel Flores (born 9 July 1987) is an Argentine professional footballer who plays as a right-back for Deportivo Madryn.

Career
Gimnasia y Esgrima of La Plata were Flores' opening senior career club, they had signed him from Academia Ernesto Duchini. He didn't appear in the Primera División but was a professional with them for three years. 2008 saw Flores join Argentino of Torneo Argentino B. Six appearances followed. Concepción del Uruguay's Gimnasia y Esgrima became his third employers in 2009, he went on to score three times - one in each of his three seasons - across seventy-six fixtures for the club. Boca Unidos (Primera B Nacional) and Guillermo Brown (Torneo Argentino A) stints subsequently occurred, along with five goals.

After spending the 2014 campaign in tier four with Las Palmas, Flores joined Gimnasia y Tiro in January 2015. Flores was sent off on his first start for Gimnasia y Tiro, prior to netting goals against Altos Hornos Zapla and Alvarado in the 2015 Torneo Federal A. Guillermo Brown of Primera B Nacional resigned Flores at the end of that season, with him remaining until August 2017 when he departed to sign for Villa Dálmine. Ten months later, Flores moved to fellow second tier team Instituto. He made his debut on 31 August 2018 during a home defeat to Agropecuario. He'd leave after two seasons there.

Mitre became Flores' tenth different club in August 2020.

Career statistics
.

References

External links

1987 births
Living people
Sportspeople from La Rioja Province, Argentina
Argentine footballers
Association football defenders
Torneo Argentino B players
Torneo Argentino A players
Primera Nacional players
Torneo Federal A players
Club de Gimnasia y Esgrima La Plata footballers
Argentino de Mendoza players
Gimnasia y Esgrima de Concepción del Uruguay footballers
Boca Unidos footballers
Guillermo Brown footballers
Club Atlético Las Palmas players
Gimnasia y Tiro footballers
Villa Dálmine footballers
Instituto footballers
Club Atlético Mitre footballers
Deportivo Madryn players